Transcription termination factor 1 is a protein that in humans is encoded by the TTF1 gene.

References

Further reading